President's House or Home or Manision may refer to:

Armenia 
President's House, Yerevan

Sri Lanka 
 President's House, Colombo

Trinidad and Tobago 
 President's House, Trinidad and Tobago

United States

Residences of the President of the United States 
 President's House (Philadelphia), home of Washington and Adams
 President's House (Ninth Street), mansion intended for the president of the United States in Philadelphia

College and university presidents' houses 
Alabama
 President's House, Marion Institute, Marion
 President's Mansion (University of Alabama)

Arizona
 President's House (Tempe, Arizona), Arizona State University

Arkansas
 President's House (Southern Arkansas University), Magnolia

Florida
 President's House (University of Florida), Gainesville

Georgia
 President's House (University of Georgia), Athens

Kentucky
President's Home (Bowling Green, Kentucky), NRHP-listed in Warren County

Louisiana
President's Home, Northwestern State University, NRHP-listed in Natchitoches Parish
Dodd College President's Home, NRHP-listed in Caddo Parish

Massachusetts
 Brandeis University President's House, Newton
 President's House (Harvard), Cambridge

Michigan
 President's House, University of Michigan

New Hampshire
 President's House (Keene State College)

New Jersey
 President's House (Princeton University)
 President's House (Rutgers), New Brunswick

New Mexico
 President's House (University of New Mexico), Albuquerque
 Nason House, formerly the University President's House at New Mexico State University

New York 

 President's House (Columbia University)
Ohio
President's House (Heidelberg University), Tiffin, NRHP-listed in Seneca County

Oklahoma
Boyd House (University of Oklahoma), Norman, known as President's House and as OU White House

Pennsylvania
 President's House (Washington & Jefferson College), Washington

Rhode Island
 President's House (Naval War College), Newport

South Carolina
 President's House (Clemson University)

Texas
President's House (Commerce, Texas), NRHP-listed in Hunt County
President's House at Texas College, Tyler, NRHP-listed in Smith County

Utah
Westminster College President's House, NRHP-listed in Salt Lake City

Virginia
 President's House (College of William & Mary), Williamsburg

West Virginia
 President's House (Bluefield State College)

Washington, D.C.
 President's House (Gallaudet College)

See also
Official residence, lists houses of head of state for each country world-wide
List of university and college presidents' houses
List of university and college presidents' houses in the United States
 Harbison College President's Home, Abbeville, South Carolina
 President's Pavilion, Kandy, Sri Lanka
 Beit HaNassi, residence of the president of Israel
 Rashtrapati Bhavan, residence of the president of India
 Rastrapati Bhawan, residence of the president of Nepal
 White House, residence of the President of the United States
 Vawter Hall and Old President's House, Virginia State University
Governor's House (disambiguation)